Table Top is an outer suburb of the city of Albury, New South Wales, located  north of Albury and  west of Bowna.
The area used to be part of the Greater Hume Shire but was recently integrated into the City of Albury.

Table Top is located in the flat area north of Albury, bounded by the Greater Hume Shire, including Jindera, to the north, and the suburbs of Hamilton Valley, Springdale Heights, Thurgoona and Wirlinga to the south.

History
Yambla Post Office opened on 1 April 1886, was renamed Table Top in 1895 and closed in 1968.

Today
Table Top is a rural and agricultural area, with a large part of the population living in an area around the Norske Skog Paper Mill.
Features of the area include the original Ettamogah Pub (based on a cartoon pub by Ken Maynard that was featured in the now defunct Australasian Post magazine), the Ettamogah Wildlife Sanctuary (later called Oze Wildlife; now closed), several wineries and Table Top Public School.

Geography 

The Table Top area is mostly flat, but includes part of the Black Range in the south and east. Part of the area is the north-western part of Lake Hume.

Residents 

The most common religion was Catholic, followed by Anglican, and the median household income was $2,475, above the NSW average of $1,829. The median age was 42.

References 

Suburbs of Albury, New South Wales
Hume Highway